Mayan-e Olya may refer to:
 Mayan-e Olya, East Azerbaijan
 Mayan-e Olya, Razavi Khorasan